This is a list in alphabetical order of cricketers who have played for Galle Cricket Club in first-class matches. Where there is an article, the link comes before the club career span, and the scorecard name (typically initials and surname) comes after. If no article is present, the scorecard name comes before the span.

C
 B. H. Chamikara (2022–23)
 L. Chaminda (1995–96)
 G. Chamindu (2014–15)
 U. Chandana (1995–96)
 W. H. Chanditha (2006–07)
 P. D. Chandrakumara (2003–04)
 N. R. Chandrasekera (1988–89 to 1991–92)
 Umega Chaturanga (2005–06 to 2013–14) : J. U. Chaturanga
 Avishka Chenuka (2018–19) : N. A. Chenuka
 P. D. Cooray (2016–17)

P
 Vishva Chathuranga (2016–17) : B. H. V. C. Peiris

References

Galle Cricket Club